Camilo Benítez (born 16 August 1999) is an Ecuadorian professional footballer who most recently played for Swope Park Rangers in the USL Championship.

Career
Benítez signed with United Soccer League side Swope Park Rangers on 9 February 2018 from Sporting Kansas City's academy.

Benítez is currently a coach with the Sporting Blue Valley program that is affiliated with Sporting Kansas City.

Personal
Benítez was born in Ibarra, Ecuador and moved to Charlotte, North Carolina when he was 13-years old.

References

External links 
 2020 Sporting Blue Valley coaching assignments
 Swope Park Rangers Profile
 

1999 births
Living people
Association football midfielders
Ecuadorian footballers
Soccer players from Charlotte, North Carolina
Sporting Kansas City II players
USL Championship players